Lunden is one of 8 districts in Örgryte borough, Gothenburg, Sweden.

Lunden is situated immediately to the east of the central area of Gothenburg. Lunden has 10206 inhabitants (2005).

History
In the beginning, many of the buildings were smaller family houses, but were later replaced by larger apartment buildings, mostly of the Landshövdingehus type, in the 1920s and 1930s.

Geography
Lunden is located in Örgryte borough, which contains 7 more distinct:
 Bagaregården
 Kärralund
 Kallebäck
 Olskroken
 Redbergslid
 Skår
 Överås

External links
Satellite Map of Lunden, Gothenburg

Gothenburg